The ingrailed clay (Diarsia mendica) is a moth of the family Noctuidae. The species was first described by Johan Christian Fabricius in 1775. It is distributed through most of Europe and the Palearctic.

This species occurs in a huge range of colours and is one of the most variable species in the family. Its forewings range in colour from very pale straw to very dark brown, with the pale forms predominant in the south of the range and the darker forms prevalent further north.

Description

The wingspan is 28–36 mm. "Forewing with basal area grey, outer area red-brown; the lines and stigmata grey; hindwing dull grey with a dark lunule and transverse line and the fringe reddish; as a rule the male is paler than the female; a very variable species alike in colour and plainness of markings; ab. congener Hbn. is wholly red-brown with the stigmata yellowish; -ab. subrufa Haw. is distinguished by having the cell dark at base and between the stigmata; — ab. conflua H.-S. nec Tr. has the ground colour reddish ochreous mottled with darker; — ab. mendica F. is like the last but shows black or dark brown spaces in the cell; — ab. ignicola H.-Sch. has the ground colour yellowish ochreous, with the markings distinct; — primulae Esp. is the same form but with the cell filled in with blackish; — ab. ochrea-virgata Tutt is a banded form, the whole space between the median and subterminal line being darker; — ab. grisea Tutt is a small dark grey form, the stigmata clear; — ab. coerulea Tutt is of a clear slaty or lilac colour with pale stigmata; — lastly, ab. lamentanda Alph. is a pale uniformly ochreous form from Siberia and Kamschatka. subsp. conflua Tr. (= thulei Stgr.)is smaller, with narrower, more pointed forewing, reddish brown varied with yellowish; the stigmata large with dark marks in cell; described originally from Iceland and occurring in Shetland and Lapland; — ab. borealis Zett. is a grey brown form without any red but with the cell blackish; obsoleta Tutt resembles borealis, but the cell is unicolorous and the markings obscure; - ab. diducta Zett. has the forewing grey with a broad rusty-testaceous fascia, and the markings obscured.

The larva is brown with black triangular markings along the side. It feeds on a wide range of plants (see list below). The species overwinters as a larva.

Biology
This moth flies at night from June to August and is attracted to light.

Recorded food plants
Calluna – heather
Campanula – harebell
Crataegus – hawthorn
Lactuca – lettuce
Pinaceae
Rubus – bramble
Rumex – dock
Salix – willow
Vaccinium
See Robinson, G. S. et al.

Subspecies 
 D. m. borealis - Scandinavia, northern and central Russia, Iceland
 D. m. mendica - central and northern Europe, except in northernmost Fennoscandia
 D. m. orkneyensis - Orkney
 D. m. thulei - Shetland
 D. m. lamentunda- Siberia, Kamchatka, Mongolia, China and Tibet
 D. m. monochroma - Alborz and other ragions of Iran
 undescribed subspecies in the north of Turkey, Armenia, the Caucasus and other regions of Transcaucasia

Similar species
Diarsia mendica ssp. mendica (Fabricius, 1775)  is difficult to certainly distinguish from its congeners. See Townsend et al.
Protolampra sobrina (Duponchel, 1843) 
Diarsia mendica ssp. thulei (Staudinger, 1891) 
Diarsia mendica ssp. orkneyensis (Bytinski-Salz, 1930) 
Diarsia rubi (Vieweg, 1790) 
Diarsia florida (Schmidt, 1859)

Notes
The flight season refers to the British Isles. This may vary in other parts of the range.

References

Chinery, Michael (1986, reprinted 1991). Collins Guide to the Insects of Britain and Western Europe.
Skinner, Bernard (1984). The Colour Identification Guide to Moths of the British Isles.

External links

 Taxonomy
Lepiforum e.V.

Diarsia
Moths described in 1775
Moths of Asia
Moths of Europe
Moths of Iceland
Taxa named by Johan Christian Fabricius